Talal Maddah (5 August 1940 – 11 August 2000) was a Saudi Arabian musician and composer. He was named Maddah after his mother's family. His fans called him "The Earth's Voice", and he was also known as "The Golden Throat". He had a substantial influence over 20th century-Arabian culture

Talal Maddah began his career emulating Hijazi singers such as Hassan Jawa and Mohammed Ali Sindi. During his career, he participated in many festivals in Saudi Arabia between 1960 and 2000. He also participated in many festivals in the Arabian Peninsula, Egypt, Syria, Lebanon, Algeria, Tunisia and Libya.

Professional career

Early career

Maddah was born in Mecca, Saudi Arabia. He was raised by his uncle.

Maddah began singing in school concerts when he was student in Al-Taif. Abdul Rahman Khundaneh, one of Maddah's classmates, played the oud and became his accompanist. Since the two boys had to keep the oud at Maddah's house to hide it from Khundaneh's father, Maddah also learned to play the instrument.

In the mid-1950s, Maddah attended a wedding in Al-Taif that featured a selection of artists such as Tariq Abdul-Hakim, Abdullah Mohammed and Abdullah Morshidi. Maddah was astonished to see a concert with a full orchestra. At the concert, he was introduced to Abbas Fayegg Ghazzawi who was then a director at Radio Jeddah. Ghazzawi encouraged him to come to record his first songs. Maddah's first song is called "Wardak Ya Zarea Al Ward" (Grower of Roses, Arabic: وردك يا زارع الورد). The song was a success and was played on the radio daily in the mid-1950s.

In the 1960s, Talal Maddah became famous due to the birth of Saudi Arabia's official radio. Along with other artists like Muhammad Ali Sindi, Fawzi Mhasson and Abdullah Mohammed, he was one of the most popular singers of the era.

The Arab world
Gradually, his music was introduced to the rest of the Arab world after his songs were played in Cairo. Egyptian composers like Mohammed Abdel Wahab, Mohammed Al Mogy and Baligh Hamdi began to write songs for him. In 1976, he had his first pan-Arab hit with "Muqadir". Over the course of his long career, Maddah collaborated with many composers, including Ibrahim Raafat, Gamal Salama, Tariq Abdul Hakim, Abu Bakr Salem Belfkih, Sami Ihsan and  Mohammed Shafiq. He also discovered and trained fellow Khaliji singer Abadi al Johar.

Talal Maddah albums

Maddah recorded about 66 official albums and 40 other albums. Moreover, throughout his 50-year career journey, Maddah composed more than 1000 songs.

Death
Maddah, who had just celebrated his 60th birthday, collapsed and died suddenly of a heart attack on Al Meftaha Stage (Arabic: مسرح المفتاحة) in Abha in front of his fans shortly after he performed an intro to one of his famous songs. The concert was aired live on Saudi National Television. Later on, the official Saudi Press Agency made a statement confirming his death and paid tribute to him and to his legacy.

Maddah's funeral was held in the city of Jeddah. He is buried in Makkah.

Awards
Maddah was the first Saudi artist to receive awards outside of Saudi Arabia. He received a Prize from Habib Bourguiba, the former president of Tunisia. Muammar Gaddafi and Hosni Mubarak also gave him awards. In 1984, King Fahd of Saudi Arabia awarded Maddah the Order of Merit of the Custodian of the Two Holy Mosques for his work.

Dedication
Talal Maddah was the subject of a Google Doodle on 5 August 2018, the 78th anniversary of his birth.

References

External links
 Talal Maddah official Fan-Club Web-Site
 Talal Maddah official Fan-Club Forum
 Talal Maddah full list of songs over 1000 songs to download for free

1940 births
2000 deaths
20th-century Saudi Arabian male singers
Musicians who died on stage
People from Mecca